Charles Le Goux de La Berchère (23 October 1647 – 2 June 1719) was a French prelate.
He served successively as Bishop of Lavaur (1677–1685), Archbishop of Aix (1685–1687), Archbishop of Albi (1687–1703) and Archbishop of Narbonne (1703–1719).

1647 births
1719 deaths
18th-century peers of France